Mesoscia guttifascia is a moth of the Megalopygidae family. It was described by Francis Walker in 1856.

References

Moths described in 1856
Megalopygidae